Gloucester County Christian School (GCCS) is a private Christian school located in the Sewell section of Mantua Township, New Jersey, United States. Gloucester County Christian School was founded in 1964 and organized by a group of parents. GCCS is owned and operated by Hardingville Bible Church. The school is a member of the American Association of Christian Schools and the Garden State Association of Christian Schools.

As of the 2017–18 school year, the school had an enrollment of 317 students and 20.4 classroom teachers (on an FTE basis), for a student–teacher ratio of 14.8:1. The school's student body was 74.8% (226) White, 8.6% (26) Black, 8.3% (25) Hispanic, 6.6% (20) Asian and 1.7% (5) two or more races.

Academics
There are many courses to learn at GCCS. The students excel in local, regional and national academic/fine arts and sports competitions. Each subject is taught and viewed through a biblical perspective. Outside the main courses include computers, gym, art, music, library, and PE each week. Although some of these, such as library, are only for the elementary classes, computer class and gym/PE are mandatory for high schoolers.

Athletics
Gloucester County Christian School offers many sports; these include: Baseball, Basketball, Soccer, Softball, and Track and Field. They are a part of the Tri-State Christian Athletic Conference. The guys sports include: JV / Varsity Soccer, JV / Varsity Basketball, JV / Varsity Baseball, and Track and Field. The girls sports include: JV / Varsity Soccer, JV / Varsity Basketball, JV Softball, and Track and Field.

References

External links

1964 establishments in New Jersey
Educational institutions established in 1964
Mantua Township, New Jersey
Private elementary schools in New Jersey
Private high schools in Gloucester County, New Jersey
Private middle schools in New Jersey
Christian schools in New Jersey